The Astra 680 is a short-barreled revolver previously manufactured by Astra of Spain. The 680 was intended primarily for civilian use, but also having served as a backup weapon or as a concealed carry weapon by gendarmes.

The Model 680 was manufactured until 1996, by Astra-Unceta y Cia SA with available chamberings being .22 Long Rifle, .22 Winchester Magnum Rimfire, .32 Smith & Wesson Long, or .38 Special. Offered frame makes included standard steel, polished steel and blued steel.

References 

.38 Special firearms
.22 LR revolvers
Revolvers of Spain